Jonas Reckermann (born 26 May 1979 in Rheine) is a retired beach volleyball player from Germany. Together with his most recent partner Julius Brink, he won the gold medal at the 2012 Summer Olympics in London, which, along with Laura Ludwig and Kira Walkenhorst are the most successful Olympic appearances of a German beach volleyball team. They were the first European duo to win the Olympic gold medal – male or female competition. In addition to that they also were the first European team ever to win a world championship title and are currently ranked 22nd on the FIVB World Tour (as of 23 July 2012).

Early tournaments
Reckermann represented his native country at the 2004 Summer Olympics in Athens, where he finished in ninth place with his then partner Markus Dieckmann. He twice won the European Beach Volleyball Championships, in 2002 and 2004.

In 2009, he won four FIVB competitions (three consecutive Grand Slams) and the German Masters of the CEV European Championship Tour with partner Julius Brink. This includes the 2009 FIVB World Championship, held from 26 June to 5 July in Stavanger, where they beat top- seeded Harley – Alison in the final and former FIVB world champions and gold medalist of the 2008 Summer Olympics Rogers – Dalhausser in the semi final.

2012 Olympics
Brink – Reckermann won the Olympic beach volleyball tournament in London in 2012. In the final, they beat the Brazilian team of Alison – Emanuel, making this the first victory of a European country at Beach Volleyball in Olympic history.

Playing partners
 Julius Brink
 Markus Dieckmann
 Mischa Urbatzka
 Eric Koreng

Retirement and media career
Reckermann announced his retirement from competition after the 2012 season due to injury.

He is currently the main pundit for Sky Germany's beach volleyball broadcasts.

References

 
 Swatch FIVB World Tour
 CEV European Championship Tour
 Homepage of Brink Reckermann (German)

1979 births
Living people
People from Rheine
Sportspeople from Münster (region)
German men's beach volleyball players
Beach volleyball blockers
Beach volleyball players at the 2004 Summer Olympics
Beach volleyball players at the 2012 Summer Olympics
Olympic beach volleyball players of Germany
Olympic gold medalists for Germany
Olympic medalists in beach volleyball
Medalists at the 2012 Summer Olympics
FIVB World Tour award winners